NGC 5474 is a  peculiar dwarf galaxy in the constellation Ursa Major.  It is one of several companion galaxies of the Pinwheel Galaxy (M101), a grand-design spiral galaxy.
Among the Pinwheel Galaxy's companions, this galaxy is the closest to the Pinwheel Galaxy itself.  The gravitational interaction between NGC 5474 and the Pinwheel Galaxy has strongly distorted the former.  As a result, the disk is offset relative to the nucleus.  The star formation in this galaxy (as traced by hydrogen spectral line emission) is also offset from the nucleus. NGC 5474 shows some signs of a spiral structure. As a result, this galaxy is often classified as a dwarf spiral galaxy, a relatively rare group of dwarf galaxies.

See also 
 Peculiar galaxy 
 Dwarf galaxy
 Ursa Major (constellation)

References

External links 
 
 
 SEDS

Unbarred spiral galaxies
Peculiar galaxies
Dwarf galaxies
Dwarf spiral galaxies
Interacting galaxies
M101 Group
Ursa Major (constellation)
5474
09013
50216